Safiran Airlines is a cargo airline based in Tehran, Iran. It specialised in international cargo flights on a charter basis, especially outsized cargo, handling and wet-leasing aircraft when required.

History 
The airline was established in 1988 and started operations in 1990. It was owned by M. A. Habibian and family (30%), M. B. Nahvi and family (30%), M. J. Nahvi and family (25%) and other shareholders (15%). The management structure is as follows:
Chairman: M. B. Nahvi
Managing Director: M. A. Habibian
VP Technical Support: Kamal Bakhshi

Fleet
As of March 2008 the Safiran Airlines fleet includes:

3 Antonov An-140
1 Boeing 737

References

External links

 Safiran Airlines official website 
Official website
Safiran airlines aircraft

2013 disestablishments in Iran
Defunct airlines of Iran
Airlines established in 1988
Airlines disestablished in 2013
Iranian companies established in 1988